Aleš Kök (born 11 December 1996) is a Slovenian male volleyball player. He is part of the Slovenia men's national volleyball team. He competed at the 2015 Men's European Volleyball Championship. At club level he plays for Astec Triglav.

See also 
 Slovenia men's national volleyball team

References

External links 
 FIVB 2016 World League Profile
 FIVB 2015 Profile
 FIVB World League 2016 Roster
 2015 FIVB Volleyball Roster
 World Of Volley Profile
 Giani gathers Slovenian Volleyball heroes ahead of World League debut

1996 births
Living people
Slovenian men's volleyball players
Place of birth missing (living people)